MacQuarrie Edge is a rock scarp rising to about  in the northern part of the Otter Highlands, in the western Shackleton Range, Antarctica. It was named by the UK Antarctic Place-Names Committee after Alister S. MacQuarrie (1935–1970), a British Antarctic Survey tractor mechanic at Halley Station, 1968–69, who worked in the Shackleton Range.

References

Escarpments of Antarctica
Landforms of Coats Land